The Toronto Show was a Canadian television variety show, which aired from 2003 to 2005 on Toronto's independent station Toronto 1.

The show was hosted by Enis Esmer, except for a series of specials hosted by Alan Park, Sean Cullen and others.

2000s Canadian variety television series
2003 Canadian television series debuts
2005 Canadian television series endings
Television shows filmed in Toronto